Josh Provan is a retired American soccer defender who played professionally in the USL A-League.

Provan graduated from Cudahy High School.  He attended the University of Wisconsin–Madison where he was a 1996 Third Team All American soccer player.  In 1997, Provan signed with the Rockford Raptors of the USISL Pro League.  In 1999, he moved to the Milwaukee Rampage of the USL A-League.  He played for the Rampage until 2001.

References

Living people
1975 births
People from Cudahy, Wisconsin
American soccer players
Milwaukee Rampage players
Rockford Raptors players
USL Second Division players
A-League (1995–2004) players
Wisconsin Badgers men's soccer players
Association football defenders